The Rattler Rail Trail is a 19 km (12 mi) rail trail which joins onto the southern end of the Riesling Trail at Auburn, South Australia. Following the route of the former Spalding railway line, the trail takes its name from the rattling old train that used to ply the route. The Rattler Rail Trail passes through farming land as it wends its way to Riverton via Rhynie. Bike hire is available in the town of Auburn.

References

External links 
Rattler Rail Trail - Rail Trails Australia

Cycling in South Australia
Rail trails in Australia
Cycleways in South Australia
Mid North (South Australia)